The 2013 Central American Junior and Youth Championships in Athletics took place on May 24–26, 2013.  The event was held at the Estadio Nacional in San José, Costa Rica.  Organized by the Central American Isthmus Athletic Confederation (CADICA), it was the 26th edition of the Junior (U-20) and the 21st edition of the Youth (U-18) competition.  A total of 83 events were contested, 20 by junior boys, 21 by junior girls, 21 by youth boys, and 21 by youth girls.  A total of 22 new championship records were set.  Overall winner on points was Costa Rica.

Medal summary
Complete results can be found on the CADICA and FECOA webpages.

Junior

Boys (U-20)

†: Event without points for team score.

Girls (U-20)

†: Event without points for team score.

Youth

Boys (U-18)

Girls (U-18)

†: Event without points for team score.
‡: This year, a 500g javelin (rather than 600g as before) was used.

Medal table (unofficial)

Team trophies
The placing table for team trophy awarded to the 1st place overall team (boys and girls categories) was published.

Overall

Boys

Junior (U-20)

Youth (U-18)

Girls

Junior (U-20)

Youth (U-18)

Participation
A total number of 247 athletes and 43 officials were reported to participate in the event.

 (89)
 (35)
 (37)
 (14)
 (26)
 (46)

References

 
International athletics competitions hosted by Costa Rica
Central American Junior and Youth Championships
Central American Junior and Youth Championships in Athletics
Sport in San José, Costa Rica
21st century in San José, Costa Rica
2013 in youth sport